The City of Limerick Act is an act passed by the Parliament of Ireland in 1292, during the reign of Edward I as Lord of Ireland.

The act covered the liberties of the citizens of Limerick.

References

1290s in law
Acts of the Parliament of Ireland (pre-1801)
1292 in Ireland
13th century in Ireland